Andrew Barton may refer to:

Politicians
 William Barton (British politician) (Andrew William Barton, 1862–1957), British Member of Parliament for Oldham, 1910–1922
Andrew Barton (16th-century MP)

Others
 Sir Andrew Barton (privateer) ( 1466–1511), Scottish privateer
 Andrew Barton, pseudonym used by the composer of The Disappointment (1762)
 Andrew Barton (journalist), lecturer in the School of Communication at the University of Miami
 Banjo Paterson (Andrew Barton Paterson, 1864–1941), Australian poet

See also
Andy Barton (disambiguation)